Chernobyl Diaries is a 2012 American disaster horror film co-written and produced by Oren Peli and directed by Brad Parker, in his directorial debut. The film stars Jonathan Sadowski, Jesse McCartney, Devin Kelley, Olivia Taylor Dudley, Ingrid Bolsø Berdal,  Nathan Phillips, and Dimitri Diatchenko, and was shot on locations in Pripyat, Ukraine, as well as Hungary, and Serbia.

Plot
Chris, his girlfriend Natalie, and their mutual friend Amanda are traveling across Europe. They stop in Kyiv, Ukraine, to visit Chris' brother, Paul, before heading on to Moscow, Russia, where Chris intends to propose to Natalie.

Paul suggests they go for an extreme tour of Pripyat, an abandoned town which sits in the shadow of the Chernobyl Nuclear Power Plant, the site of the 1986 Chernobyl nuclear disaster. Chris is against going on the tour and would rather stay on the original plan of going to Moscow, but Paul insists. They meet tour guide Yuri and are joined by a backpacking couple, Norwegian Zoe and Australian Michael. Yuri drives them through Ukraine, before they arrive at a Chernobyl Exclusion Zone checkpoint, where they are refused entry by the Ukrainian military. He then takes them to an alternate entry he discovered years ago.

The group stops at a river where Yuri points out a large, mutated fish apparently able to live on land; while returning to their van several other mutant fish are seen. The group is worried about radiation poisoning, but Yuri assures their safety with a Geiger counter. After spending a few hours exploring, Yuri takes them to the upper floor of an apartment building and shows them the Chernobyl nuclear plant on the near horizon. After hearing noises at the other end of the apartment, it is found to be a bear which runs through the hallway past them, but not harming them.

The group prepares to leave Pripyat, but Yuri finds the wires in his van have been chewed through. He tries to radio for help, to no avail. As night falls, the group decides on whether to hike to a nearby checkpoint which is 20 km (12 miles) away, or to stay put and wait for help. Suddenly, strange noises come from outside, where Yuri goes out to investigate and Chris follows. Shots are heard and Paul runs out to investigate, returning with Chris, whose leg has been severely mauled, and claiming that Yuri has been taken. While they decide to stay the night in their locked vehicle, they are attacked by dogs.

The next day, Paul, Michael, and Amanda go out to look for Yuri. They follow a trail of blood to an abandoned cafeteria and find Yuri's mutilated body. They take his gun and are chased by a creature through the building before returning to the van. Amanda checks her camera and one of the pictures shows a humanoid creature inside one of the apartment buildings. Natalie stays with the wounded Chris while the others begin the hike to the checkpoint.

During the hike, Paul, Amanda, Michael, and Zoe find a parking lot, where they find parts for Yuri's van. On the way back they are chased by dogs and also attacked by mutant fish in a stream. Night falls as the group returns to the van, only to find it upside down and ripped to shreds. They find Natalie's video camera, showing that she and Chris were attacked and captured by humanoid mutants. While searching for the two inside an old building, the group is chased by more mutants.

During their escape, a traumatized Natalie is found and rescued, but when the group gets distracted by a mysterious young girl, Natalie is captured again. The rest of the group is swarmed by a horde of mutants and are forced to retreat. While fleeing through an underground passage, Michael is captured. As they continue, they find Chris' engagement ring for Natalie, with no sign of Chris. While climbing a ladder, a gang of mutants drags Zoe back down, forcing Amanda and Paul to leave her behind, emerging from the passage right beside the exposed nuclear reactor core. Paul recognizes that extremely high radiation levels are causing their skin to blister. They come upon Natalie's body just before they are confronted by some of their mutant attackers. Fighting them off, the two survivors then encounter Ukrainian military forces outside the reactor building. Blinded by radiation, Paul stumbles toward the soldiers, who kill him.

Amanda falls unconscious and later awakens on a gurney. Several doctors, in protective hazmat suits, inform her that she is in a hospital and they will help her. The doctors reveal that the "creatures" were escaped patients, and after realizing that Amanda "knows too much," she is then forced into a dark cell and is swarmed and devoured by the recaptured patients.

Alternate ending
An alternate ending for the film features Amanda being taken away by the soldiers after they kill Paul. She is later seen in a dark hospital room, inflicted with radiation poisoning (as evidenced by her missing hair), begging for help as the film cuts to black. Then credits start to roll.

Cast

 Jonathan Sadowski as Paul Walker
 Jesse McCartney as Chris Walker
 Devin Kelley as Amanda Healey
 Olivia Taylor Dudley as Natalie Sullivan
 Ingrid Bolsø Berdal as Zoe Anderson
 Nathan Phillips as Michael Grant
 Dimitri Diatchenko as Yuri Ovechkin
 Miloš Timotijević as Ukrainian Check Point Guard
 Alex Feldman as Medic Goldshimdt
 Kristof Konrad as Medic Grotzky
 Pasha D. Lychnikoff as Doctor

Release

Theatrical
The film, produced by Alcon Entertainment and distributed by Warner Bros., was released in Russia, Canada, Bulgaria and the United States on May 25, 2012. It went on general release in the United Kingdom on June 22.

Home media
Chernobyl Diaries was released to DVD and Blu-ray Disc on October 16, 2012, in the US. The UK DVD and Blu-ray release followed on October 22, 2012. The UK release presents a longer version (about 2½ minutes) of the film than the American one.

Reception
Prior to film's release, the Friends of Chernobyl Centers, U.S., had said that the film's plot was insensitive to those who died and were injured in the disaster, also the movie was sensationalizing events that had "tragic human consequences". In response, the producer, Oren Peli, said that his film was done with the utmost respect for the victims, and that the Israeli charity Chabad's Children of Chernobyl wrote him a letter expressing their "admiration" and "kudos" for his creation. Despite this claim, others described the film as a "plot-less mess of  disaster porn", citing UK-based charity Chernobyl Children's Lifeline, who thought it was "disgusting".

The film was largely panned by critics and audiences, holding a 19% approval rating on Rotten Tomatoes based on 89 reviews. The website's critical consensus reads, "Despite an interesting premise and spooky atmospherics, Chernobyl Diaries is mostly short on suspense and originality". Critics at Spill.com acknowledged the filmmakers' attempts to create a chilling atmosphere, but criticized the film's shallow characters, numerous clichés and failure to deliver even the most basic special effects. Joe Leydon's review in Variety stated, "Scattered stretches of suspense and a few undeniably potent shocks are not enough to dissipate the sense of deja vu that prevails." James Berardinelli wrote in ReelViews, "Chernobyl Diaries is afflicted with a fatal flaw that damages many horror films: after a better-than-average setup and a promising first half, everything falls apart."  Mark Olsen, a critic from the Los Angeles Times, said: "The lack of suspense and surprise in this dispiritingly rote film becomes its own form of contamination". Positive reviews notably include Frank Scheck from The Hollywood Reporter who said: "A basic monster movie that benefits greatly from its unique setting, Chernobyl Diaries again demonstrates Oren Peli's ability to wrest scares with minimal production values and a clever premise."

See also
Cultural impact of the Chernobyl disaster
List of films about nuclear issues
List of Chernobyl-related articles

References

External links

2012 films
2012 horror films
American monster movies
Films set in 2011
Films set in Pripyat
Films set in ghost towns
Films shot in Hungary
Films shot in Serbia
Films shot in Ukraine
Films about nuclear technology
2010s monster movies
Alcon Entertainment films
FilmNation Entertainment films
Warner Bros. films
Films about the Chernobyl disaster
2012 directorial debut films
2010s English-language films
2010s American films